Willis Eugene Lamb Jr. (July 12, 1913 – May 15, 2008) was an American physicist who won the Nobel Prize in Physics in 1955 "for his discoveries concerning the fine structure of the hydrogen spectrum." The Nobel Committee that year awarded half the prize to Lamb and the other half to Polykarp Kusch, who won "for his precision determination of the magnetic moment of the electron."  Lamb was able to determine precisely a surprising shift in electron energies in a hydrogen atom (see Lamb shift).  Lamb was a professor at the University of Arizona College of Optical Sciences.

Biography
Lamb was born in Los Angeles, California, United States and attended Los Angeles High School. First admitted in 1930, he received a Bachelor of Science in Chemistry from the University of California, Berkeley in 1934.  For theoretical work on scattering of neutrons by a crystal, guided by J. Robert Oppenheimer, he received the Ph.D. in physics in 1938. Because of limited computational methods available at the time, this research narrowly missed revealing the Mössbauer Effect, 19 years before its recognition by Mössbauer. He worked on nuclear theory, laser physics, and verifying quantum mechanics.

Lamb was a physics professor at Stanford from 1951 to 1956. Lamb was the Wykeham Professor of Physics at the University of Oxford from 1956 to 1962, and also taught at Yale, Columbia and the University of Arizona. He was elected a Fellow of the American Academy of Arts and Sciences in 1963.

Lamb is remembered as a "rare theorist turned experimentalist" by D. Kaiser.

Quantum physics

In addition to his crucial and famous contribution to quantum electrodynamics via the Lamb shift,  in the latter part of his career he paid increasing attention to the field of quantum measurements. In one of his writings Lamb stated that "most people who use quantum mechanics have little need to know much about the interpretation of the subject." Lamb was also openly critical of many of the interpretational trends on quantum mechanics.

Personal
In 1939 Lamb married his first wife, Ursula Schäfer, a German student, who became a distinguished historian of Latin America (and assumed his last name). After her death in 1996, he married physicist Bruria Kaufman in 1996, whom he later divorced. In 2008 he married Elsie Wattson.

Lamb died on May 15, 2008, at the age of 94, due to complications of a gallstone disorder.

References

External links

Hans Bethe talking about Willis Lamb (video)
Willis E Lamb Award for Laser Science and Quantum Optics.
  including his Nobel Lecture, December 12, 1955 Fine Structure of the Hydrogen Atom
Collection of articles and group photograph (This photograph taken at Lasers '92 includes, right to left, Marlan Scully, W. E. Lamb, John L. Hall, and F. J. Duarte).
Obituary:Willis E. Lamb Jr., 94; Nobel Prize-Winning Physicist
National Academy of Sciences Biographical Memoir

1913 births
2008 deaths
20th-century American physicists
American Nobel laureates
Quantum physicists
Optical physicists
Experimental physicists
Columbia University faculty
National Medal of Science laureates
Nobel laureates in Physics
University of Arizona faculty
UC Berkeley College of Chemistry alumni
Wykeham Professors of Physics
Laser researchers
American people of German descent
Fellows of Optica (society)
Fellows of the American Academy of Arts and Sciences
Members of the United States National Academy of Sciences
Spectroscopists
Fellows of the American Physical Society